Astrology in Jewish antiquity (  = mazalot) is the belief that celestial bodies can influence the affairs of individuals and of entire nations upon the earth. This involves the study of the celestial bodies' respective energies based on recurring patterns that change by the hour, by the week, month,  year or by several years (time categories). In each of these time categories one of the seven planetary spheres (Sun, Venus, Mercury, Moon, Saturn, Jupiter, or Mars), along with the month's current Zodiac constellation, come into play and influence the sublunary world. At times, it involves a complex combination of several of these factors working together. In Judaism this belief is expressed by the biblical affirmation: "Knowest thou the ordinances of heaven? Canst thou set the dominion thereof in earth? (Job 38:33)," from which statement the Sages have inferred, "There is no single herb below without its corresponding star above, that beats upon it and commands it to grow."

Complementary to the records of past civilisations, the corpus of Jewish literature has preserved many of the details instructive of the determining factors involved in rendering any astrological forecast, although astrology in terms of modern science is understood to be a pseudoscience.

Rabbinic belief 

A famous meme that underscores the importance with which Judaism views the influences of the horoscope is found in "Idra Rabba" of the Zohar: Everything is dependent upon mazal (= astral influences), even the Torah scroll in the Heikhal  

In the Babylonian Talmud a controversy is presented among the sages of Israel as to whether the zodiac signs affect a person's destiny. The supportive opinions are of Rabbi Joshua the son of Levi, who lists the types of people according to the various zodiac signs, and of Rabbi Hanina, who believes that the astrological constellations (mazal) can make a person wise and can even make a person wealthy.

Contrary to this view, there is Rabbi Yohanan's view that "Israel is not bound by the effects of the changing horoscopes," who assayed to bring proof from a verse taken from the Prophet Jeremiah: "Learn not the way of the nations, nor be dismayed at the signs of the heavens because the nations are dismayed at them." The opinions of Rab, of Samuel and of Rabbi Akiva, however, seem to be supportive of applied astrology, even though the people of Israel are not bound by the influences of the constellations.

Other rabbis have vaunted their knowledge of applied astrology. Said Samuel, "I know the pathways of heaven as I do the pathways of Nehardea, excepting the comet, about which I know nothing." Elsewhere, said Rav Samuel bar Abba: "I am familiar with the streets of the firmament [in heaven] just as I am familiar with the streets of Nehardea." Rabbi Zutra bar Tobiah said in Rab's name: "He that is able to calculate the Precession of the Equinoxes (Heb. tekufot) and astrological horoscopes (Heb. mazalot) but does not, one may have no conversation with him."

Raba (ca. 350 CE) says, "Duration of life, progeny, and subsistence are dependent upon the constellations."  

The great men of Israel in the Middle Ages, viz., Rabbi Saadia Gaon (in his commentary on the Book of Creation), R. Solomon ibn Gabirol (in his Keter Malkhut) and R. Abraham bar Hiyya ha-Nasi and R. Abraham ibn Ezra (1092–1167) considered astrology to be true wisdom and even expressed this belief in their works. Rabbi Judah Halevi also acknowledges in his magnum opus, Sefer ha-Kuzari, that the celestial bodies have an influence on earthly affairs, but does not admit that the astrologers have the ability to determine the mode of operation of the star systems on human beings and other living creatures in the terrestrial world.

Maimonides (1138–1204), in his day, took a more critical approach to the topic of astrology, ruling that man was entirely incapable of foretelling futurities by observing the celestial bodies, especially if those same astrological formulae were faulty. He, therefore, cancelled its practice altogether. Among the early rabbis, Maimonides was the sole rabbinic antagonist of such practices.
One of his contemporaries and disputants, Abraham ben David of Posquières, in his glosses to Maimonides' Mishne Torah (Hil. Teshuvah 5:5), asserts the influence of the stars upon destiny, while contending that by faith in God man may overcome this influence.

Moshe Chaim Luzzatto (1707–1746), though never actually having used his knowledge of the occult to foretell futurities, speaks about the influences of the stars in his book, Derekh Hashem (II, chapter 7 - The Influence of Stars).

Proscription against idolatry 
The rabbis have distinguished between gaining an occult knowledge of the stars' influences on human beings (which is permitted) and the actual worshipping of the stars (which is prohibited), a view that is also met with the Scripture; cf. [the stars and all the host of heaven] "which the Lord thy God hath divided unto all nations" (Deut. 4:19), that is to say, the stars, which God appointed to be the means of governing His creatures, and not the objects of man's worship.

The Midrash HaGadol (on Deuteronomy 4:19) clarifies what is meant by, "[And beware] lest you raise your eyes to heaven, etc." It is hereby inferred that you are not to say, 'since these stars and constellations govern the world, and they provide light unto the entire universe, and they serve before their Creator on High, it is fitting that we serve them and bow down unto them, just as the king would want [all] human beings to behave with respect towards his servants and ministers.' For this reason it says, lest you raise your eyes to heaven, beware that you do not err in this manner, on account of what [is written], which the Lord thy God hath divided unto all nations. They (i.e. the astrological horoscopes) have been delivered into the hands of the nations, so that they may live [thereby] and their beings be sustained [thereby], [without] suffering loss, as is the custom of the world. But you (i.e. the nation of Israel) have been given over to me, and I do not behave towards you as is customarily practised with all the world, as it says, But the Lord has taken you (Deut. 4:20), etc. Likewise he says, Learn not the way of the nations, nor be dismayed at the signs of the heavens; for the gentiles are dismayed at them (Jer. 10:2). The nations of the world are alarmed by them, but Israel is not alarmed by them."  

A similar theme is found in other rabbinic literature concerning Abraham the patriarch, who, although wise in the astrological sciences, and who saw thereby that he would not beget any children, was reprimanded by God who said to him: "Break away from your astrological speculations, for [the people of] Israel are not bound by the influences of the horoscope." By this Rashi learnt that through prayers, repentance and meritorious deeds (sometimes also through a change of name), they are able to alter what has been determined for them.

The people of Israel are prohibited by Jewish law to consult the astrologers and star-gazers for guidance, but are commanded to be perfect in their awe of God and to consult him for guidance, even when they are told by astrologers what might happen.

Astral influences and how they are determined 
The day is divided into 12 equal hours. The night, likewise, is divided into 12 equal hours. In both cases, the method of configuration used in measuring the hour is known as the Relative hour. To determine the length of each relative hour, one needs but simply know two variables: (a) the precise time of sunrise, and (b) the precise time of sunset. Although in Talmudic literature one begins to reckon the beginning of a day some 72 minutes before sunrise and where each day ends 13½ minutes after the sun has already set, here, in the case of astrological computations, it was only necessary to reckon the day from the moment of sunrise. Rashi, however, alludes to the day beginning at dawn. By collecting the total number of minutes in any given day (from daylight hours) and dividing the total number of minutes by 12, the quotient that one is left with is the number of minutes to each hour. In summer months, when the days are long, the length of each hour during daytime can be as much as 77 minutes or more, whereas the length of each hour during nighttime can be less than 42 minutes. 

To each hour of the day and night is assigned one of the seven planets or spheres, which same planet governs the world during that hour. The names of these planets are: Saturn (shabtai), Venus (nogah), Jupiter (tzedek), Mercury (kokhav), Mars (ma'adim), Moon (levanah) and the Sun (ḥamah). [Note: The ancients conceived that there were only seven primary planets. The moon, although a satellite rather than a planet, was also numbered among them; the sun, which is a star rather than a planet, was also numbered among them. The earth was not numbered among them since it was central to the rest. Uranus, Neptune and Pluto, as well as the other recently discovered planets and satellites, were not known to the ancients, and therefore are considered trivial to the rest]. The star or planet that begins the first diurnal hour of a particular weekday, or the first nocturnal hour of a particular weeknight, it is the same star or planet that broadly governs that entire day or night.

The 12 constellations are the result of the seasonal movement of the stars. Even so, their observance and reckoning in Israel are believed by some scholars to have been learnt from Hellenistic culture, after first being divested of their idolatrous influences.

Accordingly, God determined that each of the seven planets be subordinate to the twelve constellations of the Zodiac, and work in conjunction with them. For example, the Sun is directly subservient to the influences emanating from the constellation known as Leo, while the Moon is subservient to the influences emanating from the constellation known as Cancer. Mars is subservient to the influences emanating from two constellations, namely, Aries and Scorpio. The planet Venus is also subservient to the influences emanating from two constellations, namely, Taurus and Libra. The planet Mercury is, likewise, subservient to two constellations, drawing its influences from them, namely, that of Gemini and Virgo. The planet Saturn is subservient to two constellations, those being Capricorn and Aquarius, whence it draws its influences. Finally, the planet Jupiter is directly subordinate to the influences emanating from Sagittarius and Pisces. 

Weekly duties (by night): Each of the seven planets takes turn governing one day of the week, with the active involvement of all the planets on that same day working in concert, hour after hour, day by day, night by night, such that on the evening that commences Sunday (i.e. Saturday night), the night is governed by Mercury (kokhav), which begins its turn of duty in the first hour of the night, followed by all the other planets one after the other. On the evening that commences Monday (i.e. Sunday night), the night is governed by Jupiter (tzedek), which begins its turn of duty in the first hour of the night, followed by all the other planets one after the other. And so it is in this manner all throughout the week, the evening that commences Tuesday (i.e. Monday night) is governed by Venus (nogah); the evening that commences Wednesday (i.e. Tuesday night) is governed by Saturn (shabtai); the evening that commences Thursday (i.e. Wednesday night) is governed by the Sun (ḥamah); the evening that commences Friday (i.e. Thursday night) is governed by the Moon (levanah); the evening that commences Saturday (i.e. Friday night) is governed by Mars (ma'adim).

Hourly duties: Since each planet takes its turn of duty in the 12-hour night, the order taken in their hourly rotation is as follows: When Mercury (kokhav) finishes the 1st hour of the night, it is joined by the Moon (levanah) who takes up the 2nd hour of the night, followed by Saturn (shabtai) who takes up the 3rd hour of the night, followed by Jupiter (tzedek) who takes up the 4th hour of the night, followed by Mars (ma'adim) who takes up the 5th hour of the night, followed by the Sun (ḥamah) whose influence takes up the 6th hour of the night, followed by Venus (nogah) who takes up the 7th hour of the night, and in this order it is repeated until the 12-hour night has concluded for each of the seven nights. This hourly rotation is denoted by the mnemonic . Fixing their rotation in such a way, hour by hour, was seen as vital in order to determine the character of the child who is born at any given hour of the night, based on the hour's acting "mazal" (astrological influence), in accordance with the principle laid out by Rabbi Hanina: "Not the constellation of the day but that of the hour is the determining influence."

Weekly duties (by day): As in the night, so, too, each of the 12-hour weekdays has a set order pre-determined for it, while each of the seven planets rotating and serving in its respective hour. However, the planet that began to serve in the first hour of the night is not the same planet that begins in the first hour of the day. During the weekdays, the first hour of the first day of the week (Sunday), starts with the influences of the Sun (hence: Sunday); the first hour of the second day of the week (Monday) starts with the influences of the Moon (hence: Monday); the first hour of the third day of the week (Tuesday) with Mars, and the first hour of the fourth day of the week (Wednesday) with Mercury, while the first hour of the fifth day of the week (Thursday) with Jupiter, and the first hour of the sixth day of the week (Friday) with Venus, and lastly, the first hour of the seventh day of the week (Saturday) with Saturn.

Hourly duties: When the Sun finishes the 1st hour of the day on Sunday, it is joined by Venus who takes up the 2nd hour of the day on Sunday, followed by Mercury who takes up the 3rd hour of the day on Sunday, followed by the Moon whose influence takes up the 4th hour of the day on Sunday, followed by Saturn who takes up the 5th hour of the day on Sunday, followed by Jupiter who takes up the 6th hour of the day on Sunday, followed by Mars who takes up the 7th hour of the day on Sunday, and in this order it is repeated until the 12-hour day has concluded. Again, fixing their rotation in such a way, hour by hour, was seen as vital in order to determine the character of the child who is born at any given hour of the day. The mnemonic used by the Sages of Israel to remember their order of rotation is  = ShaTzaM ḤaNKaL (shabtai [= Saturn] → tzedek [= Jupiter] → ma'adim [= Mars] → ḥamah [= Sun] → nogah [= Venus] → kokhav [= Mercury] → levanah [= Moon]).  

Although each of the seven planets will rotate one after the other on an hourly basis, whether by day or whether by night, it is only the planet or orb that began to serve in the first hour, whether by day or whether by night, that is considered the principal planet and master of that entire day (if it began its turn of duty in the first hour of the day), or the principal planet and master of that entire night (if it began its turn of duty in the first hour of the night).  The participation of all the other planets on that same day or that same night is inconsequential to the fact that the mazal (= astral influences) for that day, or what is called mazal yom, belongs to the planet that began serving in the first hour of the day, or in the first hour of the night, while the other planets are only concerned with their specific hour, or what is called mazal sha'ah. 

Since the Moon begins its turn of duty in the first hour of every Monday morning, and Jupiter begins its turn of duty in the first hour of every Thursday morning, and since both these planets are considered planets possessing good influences, it follows that Mondays and Thursdays are considered auspicious days in the Jewish calendar.

Energies emanating from the seven classical planets

Other factors taken into consideration
To accurately determine the time in which each of the Seven Planets are in their respective line of duty, per hour, one must either have access to a printed lunar calendar showing the Jewish months, and know the precise starting point for each day and night, or else be familiar with the ever-changing aspects of the Jewish months, as the planetary influences will change with the conjunction of the moon with the sun, also known as the New Moon (occurring every 29 days, 12 hours and 793 parts of an hour), as also with the intercalation of the lunar month during a Jewish Leap Year (occurring seven times in a 19-year period), when the lunar month Nisan and its influences will be delayed by one month on account of an additional lunar month Adar.

Events attributed to the influences of the constellations
 In Jewish thought, the destruction of, both, the First and Second Temples which  happened in the lunar month of Av is linked to the astrological influences of Leo (arieh), which are generally considered to be bad. For this reason, the use of the rabbinic dictum, "When Av ushers-in, happiness is diminished", is commonly heard in the mouths of the Jewish people. The month is marked by the Ninth of Av (Tisha B'Av) fast day. During the same lunar month and its astral influences, the Jewish populous of Betar met their destruction under the Emperor Hadrian in the 2nd-century CE.

 King Edward I of England issued his decree (Edict of Expulsion) on 18 July, in the year 1290 CE (a date corresponding with the 9th-day of the lunar month Av when the month's influences were under the sign of the Zodiac Leo), that all Jews in his kingdom will be expelled from the country, and whosoever remained in the country beyond November of that same year would be executed.

 The outbreak of World War I began on 28 July, 1914 (a date corresponding with the 5th-day of the lunar month Av when the month's influences were under the sign of the Zodiac Leo); the Austro-Hungarian Empire having then declared war on Serbia. On the 7th-day of the lunar month Av, Russia joined the war. On the 9th-day of the lunar month Av, Germany joined the war.

Kabbalah
Kabbalist and Rabbi, Hayyim Vital (1542–1620) has explained the Seven Classical planets in a more conceptual and esoteric sense. While ranking ten spheres (realms) from the highest to the lowest, he describes the Ninth Sphere as having nothing in it, and which rejects the presence of any star. As for the Eighth Sphere, he states that all the stars of the universe, with the 12 constellations of the Zodiac, are contained therein, being below the Ninth Sphere, while each of the Seven classical planets occupies a space or realm below them: In the Seventh Sphere there is only one planet, Saturn (shabtai); in the Sixth Sphere there is only one planet, Jupiter (tzedek); in the Fifth Sphere there is only one planet, Mars (ma'adim); in the Fourth Sphere there is only one star, the Sun (ḥamah); in the Third Sphere there is only one planet, Venus (nogah); in the Second Sphere there is only one planet, Mercury; and in the First Sphere there is only the Moon (levanah). Hayyim Vital does not speak about their physical distance in relation to the earth, seeing that, besides the Moon (a satellite), the planet Venus is the closest planet, physically, to the earth. Rather, everything is expressed in relative spiritual distances, by virtue of their rank.

Hayyim Vital, when speaking of their relative influences, wrote: "It has already been explained in the books on the science of astrology that all the changing occurrences which take place and which appear anew in the world, they are in accordance with the encounter of one of the Seven Planets standing in proximity to a certain star of the twelve astrological constellations located in the Eighth Sphere, or else in accordance with the encounter of some of those planets which belong to the Seven, when they are found together in one place. Moreover, any encounter of the Seven Planets with the other [celestial] forms found in the [vast] open space of the Eighth Sphere will cause a little of the instructions [relegated unto it] to surge, although not with the same vigor as in the place of those twelve astrological constellations that are synchronous with the Eighth Sphere."

The author of this work, without divulging the influences of the horoscopes, names simply those things created by means of the letters, naming also the weekdays, seven groupings of words and their opposites (life and death; peace and evil disturbances; wisdom and foolishness; wealth and poverty; fertility and desolation; beauty and ugliness; governance and servitude), among other things. According to Judah Halevi, the seven planets and the 12 constellations, and the various other examples mentioned in the book, are the means by which man is capable of understanding the unity and omnipotence of God, which are multiform on one side and, yet, uniform on the other.

Fatalism 
While astrology in Jewish thought is generally acknowledged to mean that "every happening related to man, whether small or great, has been delivered into the power of the stars by the blessed Creator," it still allows for self-determination and free will of the individual in what concerns his choice of right and wrong actions, in spite of fate governing other aspects of man's life. This is expressed by the rabbinic dictum: "Everything is determined by heaven, except one's fear of heaven," meaning, everything in a person's life is predetermined by God —except that person's choice to be either good or bad; righteous or wicked, which is left up entirely to his own free will. Under this principle, as articulated by 13th-century rabbinic scholar, Menachem Meiri, a man that is born under the influences of Mars will have a natural inclination to shed blood, and if he were the son of a king born under the same Martian influence, he will grow-up to wage wars on other countries, and when victorious, he will sentence the defeated enemy to be executed. Even so, an ordinary man that is born under such influences should be instructed to take-up the profession of ritual slaughter, or livestock butcher, or similar skill crafts (e.g. mohel). So, too, with all the other signs of the Zodiac which incline to a certain unwanted trait, man is able to choose between right and wrong, and between good and bad.

See also 
 Hebrew astronomy
 Hebrew calendar
 Jewish views on astrology
 Mazzaroth
 Western astrology
 Zodiac

References

Bibliography

, s.v. Deuteronomy 4:19  
 (reprinted from Jerusalem editions, 1907, 1917 and 1988)
, responsum no. 118

 

  
 
, s.v. Psalm 19

, Shabbat 156a, s.v. 

 

 (reprinted from 1880 edition)

Further reading

External links 
 Jewish Encyclopedia (1906) - Astrology
 David Clive Rubin, Astrology in the Torah: A Comparative Study of Astrological Themes in the Hebrew Bible and Babylonian Talmud, Dissertation submitted in partial fulfillment of an M.A. in Cultural Astronomy and Astrology, University of Wales Trinity Saint David (January 2019)

 
History of astrology
Pseudoscience literature
Astrological texts